SN 1987A was a type II supernova in the Large Magellanic Cloud, a dwarf satellite galaxy of the Milky Way. Its brightness peaked in May, with an apparent magnitude of about 3.

It was the first supernova that modern astronomers were able to study in great detail, and its observations have provided much insight into core-collapse supernovae.

SN 1987A provided the first opportunity to confirm by direct observation the radioactive source of the energy for visible light emissions, by detecting predicted gamma-ray line radiation from two of its abundant radioactive nuclei. This proved the radioactive nature of the long-duration post-explosion glow of supernovae.

For over thirty years, the expected collapsed neutron star could not be found, but in 2019, indirect evidence for its presence was found with the Atacama Large Millimeter Array telescope, with further evidence found in 2021 using the Chandra and NuSTAR X-ray telescopes.

Discovery

SN 1987A was discovered independently by Ian Shelton and Oscar Duhalde at the Las Campanas Observatory in Chile on February 24, 1987, and within the same 24 hours by Albert Jones in New Zealand.

Later investigations found photographs showing the supernova brightening rapidly early on February 23.  On March 4–12, 1987, it was observed from space by Astron, the largest ultraviolet space telescope of that time.

Progenitor

Four days after the event was recorded, the progenitor star was tentatively identified as Sanduleak −69 202 (Sk -69 202), a blue supergiant.
After the supernova faded, that identification was definitively confirmed by Sk −69 202 having disappeared. This was an unexpected identification, because models of high mass stellar evolution at the time did not predict that blue supergiants are susceptible to a supernova event.

Some models of the progenitor attributed the color to its chemical composition rather than its evolutionary state, particularly the low levels of heavy elements, among other factors. There was some speculation that the star might have merged with a companion star before the supernova. However, it is now widely understood that blue supergiants are natural progenitors of some supernovae, although there is still speculation that the evolution of such stars could require mass loss involving a binary companion.

Neutrino emissions

Approximately two to three hours before the visible light from SN 1987A reached Earth, a burst of neutrinos was observed at three neutrino observatories. This was likely due to neutrino emission, which occurs simultaneously with core collapse, but before visible light is emitted. Visible light is transmitted only after the shock wave reaches the stellar surface. At 07:35 UT, Kamiokande II detected 12 antineutrinos; IMB, 8 antineutrinos; and Baksan, 5 antineutrinos; in a burst lasting less than 13 seconds. Approximately three hours earlier, the Mont Blanc liquid scintillator detected a five-neutrino burst, but this is generally not believed to be associated with SN 1987A.

The Kamiokande II detection, which at 12 neutrinos had the largest sample population, showed the neutrinos arriving in two distinct pulses. The first pulse started at 07:35:35 and comprised 9 neutrinos, all of which arrived over a period of 1.915 seconds. A second pulse of three neutrinos arrived between 9.219 and 12.439 seconds after the first neutrino was detected, for a pulse duration of 3.220 seconds.

Although only 25 neutrinos were detected during the event, it was a significant increase from the previously observed background level. This was the first time neutrinos known to be emitted from a supernova had been observed directly, which marked the beginning of neutrino astronomy. The observations were consistent with theoretical supernova models in which 99% of the energy of the collapse is radiated away in the form of neutrinos. The observations are also consistent with the models' estimates of a total neutrino count of 1058 with a total energy of 1046 joules, i.e. a mean value of some dozens of MeV per neutrino.

The neutrino measurements allowed upper bounds on neutrino mass and charge, as well as the number of flavors of neutrinos and other properties. For example, the data show that within 5% confidence, the rest mass of the electron neutrino is at most 16 eV/c2, 1/30,000 the mass of an electron.  The data suggest that the total number of neutrino flavors is at most 8 but other observations and experiments give tighter estimates. Many of these results have since been confirmed or tightened by other neutrino experiments such as more careful analysis of solar neutrinos and atmospheric neutrinos as well as experiments with artificial neutrino sources.

Neutron star

SN 1987A appears to be a core-collapse supernova, which should result in a neutron star given the size of the original star. The neutrino data indicate that a compact object did form at the star's core. Since the supernova first became visible, astronomers have been searching for the collapsed core. The Hubble Space Telescope has taken images of the supernova regularly since August 1990 without a clear detection of a neutron star.

A number of possibilities for the "missing" neutron star are being considered. The first is that the neutron star is enshrouded in dense dust clouds so that it cannot be seen. Another is that a pulsar was formed, but with either an unusually large or small magnetic field. It is also possible that large amounts of material fell back on the neutron star, so that it further collapsed into a black hole. Neutron stars and black holes often give off light as material falls onto them. If there is a compact object in the supernova remnant, but no material to fall onto it, it would be very dim and could therefore avoid detection. Other scenarios have also been considered, such as whether the collapsed core became a quark star. In 2019, evidence was presented that a neutron star was inside one of the brightest dust clumps close to the expected position of the supernova remnant. In 2021, further evidence was presented that the hard X-ray emission from SN 1987A originates in the pulsar wind nebula. The latter result is supported by a three-dimensional magnetohydrodynamic model, which describes the evolution of SN 1987A from the SN event to the current age, and reconstructs the ambient environment around the neutron star at various epochs, thus allowing to derive the absorbing power of the dense stellar material around the pulsar.

Light curve

Much of the light curve, or graph of luminosity as a function of time, after the explosion of a type II supernova such as SN 1987A is produced by the energy from radioactive decay. Although the luminous emission consists of optical photons, it is the radioactive power absorbed that keeps the remnant hot enough to radiate light. Without the radioactive heat, it would quickly dim. The radioactive decay of 56Ni through its daughters 56Co to 56Fe produces gamma-ray photons that are absorbed and dominate the heating and thus the luminosity of the ejecta at intermediate times (several weeks) to late times (several months). Energy for the peak of the light curve of SN1987A was provided by the decay of 56Ni to 56Co (half life of 6 days) while energy for the later light curve in particular fit very closely with the 77.3-day half-life of 56Co decaying to 56Fe. Later measurements by space gamma-ray telescopes of the small fraction of the 56Co  and 57Co gamma rays that escaped the SN1987A remnant without absorption confirmed earlier predictions that those two radioactive nuclei were the power source.

Because the 56Co in SN1987A has now completely decayed, it no longer supports the luminosity of the SN 1987A ejecta. That is currently powered by the radioactive decay of 44Ti with a half life of about 60 years. With this change, X-rays produced by the ring interactions of the ejecta began to contribute significantly to the total light curve. This was noticed by the Hubble Space Telescope as a steady increase in luminosity 10,000 days after the event in the blue and red spectral bands.

Observations of the radioactive power from their decays in the 1987A light curve have measured accurate total masses of the 56Ni, 57Ni, and 44Ti created in the explosion, which agree with the masses measured by gamma-ray line space telescopes and provides nucleosynthesis constraints on the computed supernova model.

Interaction with circumstellar material

The three bright rings around SN 1987A that were visible after a few months in images by the Hubble Space Telescope are material from the stellar wind of the progenitor. These rings were ionized by the ultraviolet flash from the supernova explosion, and consequently began emitting in various emission lines. These rings did not "turn on" until several months after the supernova; the turn-on process can be very accurately studied through spectroscopy. The rings are large enough that their angular size can be measured accurately: the inner ring is 0.808 arcseconds in radius. The time light traveled to light up the inner ring gives its radius of 0.66 (ly) light years. Using this as the base of a right angle triangle and the angular size as seen from the Earth for the local angle, one can use basic trigonometry to calculate the distance to SN 1987A, which is about 168,000 light-years. The material from the explosion is catching up with the material expelled during both its red and blue supergiant phases and heating it, so we observe ring structures about the star.

Around 2001, the expanding (>7000 km/s) supernova ejecta collided with the inner ring. This caused its heating and the generation of x-rays—the x-ray flux from the ring increased by a factor of three between 2001 and 2009. A part of the x-ray radiation, which is absorbed by the dense ejecta close to the center, is responsible for a comparable increase in the optical flux from the supernova remnant in 2001–2009. This increase of the brightness of the remnant reversed the trend observed before 2001, when the optical flux was decreasing due to the decaying of 44Ti isotope.

A study reported in June 2015, using images from the Hubble Space Telescope and the Very Large Telescope taken between 1994 and 2014, shows that the emissions from the clumps of matter making up the rings are fading as the clumps are destroyed by the shock wave. It is predicted the ring would fade away between 2020 and 2030. These findings are also supported by the results of a three-dimensional hydrodynamic model which describes the interaction of the blast wave with the circumstellar nebula.
The model also shows that X-ray emission from ejecta heated up by the shock will be dominant very soon, after which the ring would fade away. As the shock wave passes the circumstellar ring it will trace the history of mass loss of the supernova's progenitor and provide useful information for discriminating among various models for the progenitor of SN 1987A.

In 2018, radio observations from the interaction between the circumstellar ring of dust and the shockwave has confirmed the shockwave has now left the circumstellar material.  It also shows that the speed of the shockwave, which slowed down to 2,300 km/s while interacting with the dust in the ring, has now re-accelerated to 3,600 km/s.

Condensation of warm dust in the ejecta

Soon after the SN 1987A outburst, three major groups embarked in a photometric monitoring of the supernova: the South African Astronomical Observatory (SAAO), the Cerro Tololo Inter-American Observatory (CTIO), and the European Southern Observatory (ESO). In particular, the ESO team reported an infrared excess which became apparent beginning less than one month after the explosion (March 11, 1987).  Three possible interpretations for it were discussed in this work: the infrared echo hypothesis was discarded, and thermal emission from dust that could have condensed in the ejecta was favoured (in which case the estimated temperature at that epoch was ~ 1250 K, and the dust mass was approximately ). The possibility that the IR excess could be produced by optically thick free-free emission seemed unlikely because the luminosity in UV photons needed to keep the envelope ionized was much larger than what was available, but it was not ruled out in view of the eventuality of electron scattering, which had not been considered.

However, none of these three groups had sufficiently convincing proofs to claim for a dusty ejecta on the basis of an IR excess alone.

An independent Australian team advanced several argument in favour of an echo interpretation.  This seemingly straightforward interpretation of the nature of the IR emission was challenged by the ESO group and definitively ruled out after presenting optical evidence for the presence of dust in the SN ejecta.
To discriminate between the two interpretations, they considered the implication of the presence of an echoing dust cloud on the optical light curve, and on the existence of diffuse optical emission around the SN.  They concluded that the expected optical echo from the cloud should be resolvable, and could be very bright with an integrated visual brightness of magnitude 10.3 around day 650. However, further optical observations, as expressed in SN light curve, showed no inflection in the light curve at the predicted level. Finally, the ESO team presented a convincing clumpy model for dust condensation in the ejecta.

Although it had been thought more than 50 years ago that dust could form in the ejecta of a core-collapse supernova, which in particular could explain the origin of the dust seen in young galaxies, that was the first time that such a condensation was observed. If SN 1987A is a typical representative of its class then the derived mass of the warm dust formed in the debris of core collapse supernovae is not sufficient to account for all the dust observed in the early universe. However, a much larger reservoir of ~0.25 solar mass of colder dust (at ~26 K) in the ejecta of SN 1987A was found with the Hershel infrared space telescope in 2011 and confirmed with the Atacama Large Millimeter Array (ALMA) in 2014.

ALMA observations
Following the confirmation of a large amount of cold dust in the ejecta, ALMA has continued observing SN 1987A. Synchrotron radiation due to shock interaction in the equatorial ring has been measured. Cold (20–100K) carbon monoxide (CO) and silicate molecules (SiO) were observed. The data show that CO and SiO distributions are clumpy, and that different nucleosynthesis products (C, O and Si) are located in different places of the ejecta, indicating the footprints of the stellar interior at the time of the explosion.

See also
 History of supernova observation
 List of supernovae
 List of supernova remnants
 List of supernova candidates

References

Sources

Further reading

External links

 
 AAVSO: More information on the discovery of SN 1987A
 Rochester Astronomy discovery timeline
 Light curves and spectra on the Open Supernova Catalog
 Light echoes from Sn1987a, Movie with real images by the group EROS2
 
 SN 1987A at ESA/Hubble
 Supernova 1987A, WIKISKY.ORG
 More information at Phil Plait's Bad Astronomy site
 3D View of Supernova's 'Heart' Sheds New Light on Star Explosions (Images) - Space.com

Supernova remnants
Supernovae
Large Magellanic Cloud
Astronomical objects discovered in 1987
Dorado (constellation)